The Triumph TR5 is a sports car built by the Triumph Motor Company in Coventry, England, between August 1967 and September 1968.

Visually similar to the Michelotti-designed TR4 roadster it was derived from, the TR5 replaced Triumph's  SAE Standard inline-four engine with the much more powerful Lucas mechanical fuel-injected  Triumph 2.5-litre straight-6. Price pressures and tighter emissions standards in the U.S. resulted in a much less powerful carburetted version, the TR250, being sold on the North American market.

At the time, fuel injection was uncommon in road cars. Triumph claimed in their sales brochure that it was the "First British production sports car with petrol injection".

TR5
The base price of a 1968 TR5 in the UK was £1,260 including taxes. Standard equipment included front disc brakes, independent rear suspension, rack and pinion steering and a four speed gearbox. Optional extras included wire wheels (£38), overdrive (£60), and a tonneau cover (£13).

The TR5 was available with the "Surrey Top" hard top, a weather protection system with rigid rear section including the rear window and removable fabric section over the driver and passenger's heads.

Specifications
Taken from the UK sales brochure.
 Engine: 2498 cc, 6 cylinder, 74.7 mm bore, 95 mm stroke, 9.5:1 compression ratio, 
 Turning circle: 
 Ground clearance: 
 Luggage capacity:
 Max width: 
 Max height: 
Capacities:
Fuel tank: 
Engine sump: 
Gearbox: 
Acceleration in top:
30 to 50 mph: 7 s
40 to 60 mph: 7 s
60 to 80 mph: 8 s
Standing  : 16.5 s
Gear ratios:

Available colours:

Performance
Road tests at the time reported slightly different performance figures:

The TR5 engine was carried forward to the TR6.

Production
The TR5 was produced in small numbers when compared with either the TR250 or the later TR6, with just 2,947 units produced; the first car was assembled on 29 August 1967 and the last on 19 September 1968. Of these, 1,161 were destined for the UK market, the remainder were left hand drive and were exported to France, Belgium and Germany amongst other countries.   In the first quarter of 2011 there were approximately 410 licensed and 74 SORN TR5s registered with the DVLA.

TR250
The Triumph TR250 was built during the same period for the North American market.  Price pressures and tighter emission regulations resulted in twin Zenith-Stromberg carburettors being fitted instead of the TR5's Lucas fuel injection system. Otherwise it is nearly identical.

The TR250's engine delivered 111 bhp (81 kW), 39 bhp less than the TR5;  acceleration took 10.6 seconds.  The TR250 was also available with the Surrey Top system.

In 1968, the TR250 sold in North America for approximately $3,395, with wire wheels an $118 option, overdrive $175, and air conditioning $395.

Specifications
Engine:
 2,498 cc, inline-six cylinder,  bore,  stroke, 8.5:1 compression ratio,  at 4,500 rpm

Turning circle: 10.1 m (33 ft)

Capacities:
Fuel tank: 51 litres (11.22 imp gal; 13.47 US gal)
Engine sump: 5.4 L (9.64 imp pt)
Gearbox: 1.13 L (2 imp pt)
Performance:
0 to : 10.6 seconds

0 to : 39 seconds
Fuel consumption:

Production
A total of 8,484 TR250s were built, many destined for the US and Canada. More than 1300 TR250s are still viable in the world today.  Many can now be found outside the United States, primarily in Europe.

Gallery

References

TR5
Sports cars
Roadsters
Cars introduced in 1967
Cars discontinued in 1968
1960s cars
Rear-wheel-drive vehicles